Le Far West ( The Wild West) is a 1973 Belgian-French comedy film directed by Jacques Brel. It was entered into the 1973 Cannes Film Festival. This was Brel's ninth feature film, and his second directorial effort. Brel was obsessed with "le Far West" (the Wild West). The film was released 15 May 1973.

Plot
Jacques, a 40-year-old citizen of Brussels, meets the fakir, Abracadabra who, before dying, gives him a special power. Jacques then meets Gabriel, a generous man, who dresses up as Davy Crockett, and who follows Jacques without asking questions. The two companions and other new friends set out to conquer the wild west, their childhood - just as Voltaire sought Eldorado, and Saint-Exupéry the unknown planet. The wild west they seek cannot be found, because it is an imaginary place, a piece of happiness buried in our hearts.

Cast
 Jacques Brel as Jacques
 Danièle Évenou as Danièle
 Gabriel Jabbour as Gabriel
 Véronique Mucret as Véro

References

External links

1973 films
1970s French-language films
1973 comedy films
Films directed by Jacques Brel
Belgian comedy films
French comedy films
1970s French films